Nabiganj is an Upazila of Habiganj District in the Division of Sylhet, Bangladesh.

History
After the Conquest of Gour in 1303, many disciples of Shah Jalal migrated and settled in present-day Nabiganj where they preached Islam to the local people. Shah Sikandar migrated to Paschimgaon (Sikandarpur), Hafiz Muhammad Zakariyyah Arabi to Pithua, Shah Sadruddin Qurayshi to Parbatpur (Sadrabad) and Qazi Tajuddin Qurayshi to Chouki.

In the late 17th century, Inathganj Bazar was founded. Inathganj became a centre for the Asian Jute trade. The current Inathganj High School was originally a jute warehouse. Many ships would crowd in the banks of Inathganj Bazar, and go to many corners of the world, and evidence of this remains at the present-day high school.

Geography

It has 41358 households and total area .

Demographics
As of the 1991 Bangladesh census, Nabiganj has a population of 246933. Males constitute 50.27% of the population, and females 49.73%. This Upazila's eighteen up population is 126527. Nabiganj has an average literacy rate of 26.4% (7+ years), and the national average of 32.4% literate.

Administration
Nabiganj Upazila is divided into 13 union parishads: Aushkandi, Bausha, Debparra, Digholbak, Gaznaipur, Inatganj, Kaliarbhanga, Kargoan, Kurshi, Nabiganj Sadar, Paniumda, Paschim Bara Bhakoir, and Purba Bara Bhakoir. The union parishads are subdivided into 219 mauzas and 355 villages.

People

 Abdul Moshabbir, lawyer
 Abdul Munim Chowdhury, former MP
 Abdul Momin Imambari, Bangladeshi Islamic scholar and politician
 Abdur Rouf Choudhury, writer
 Dewan Farid Gazi, politician
 Foysol Choudhury, businessman
 Gazi Mohammad Shahnawaz, politician
 Ismat Ahmed Chowdhury, politician
 Khalilur Rahman Chowdhury, politician
 Shegufta Bakht Chaudhuri, fourth Governor of Bangladesh Bank
 Shah A M S Kibria, former Finance Minister of Bangladesh
 Anudvaipayan Bhattacharya, physician
 Enamul Haque, deputy secretary, Bangladesh Parliament secretariat

See also
Upazilas of Bangladesh
Districts of Bangladesh
Divisions of Bangladesh

References

Upazilas of Habiganj District